2015 Ballabhgarh riot refers to the attacks on 400 Muslim villagers of Atali village  Ballabhgarh, Haryana, India by locals, over the issue of land of mosque, allotted to the Haryana Waqf Board. The riot left nearly 400 Muslims homeless and exodus of many families.

Background
The incident took place on 25 May 2015 in the village of Atali in Ballabgarh, Faridabad. According to the locals, the cause of the confrontation was a dispute over a 30-year-old mosque. In 2009, the Hindu community of the village claimed that the property belonged to the village Panchayat, while the Muslims insisted that the land belonged to the Haryana Waqf board. In March 2015, the Faridabad court ruled in favour of the Muslim community. The Hindus however, continued to raise objections, with some advocating the demolition of the mosque because it stood adjacent to a temple.

Aftermath
A mass of 2000 people attacked the village using swords, bricks, and fire as weapons of choice. The mosque was torched and the Muslims of the village fled. Muslims believe that they were selectively targeted, citing instances such as the only shop burned in a vendor's market belonged to Muslim merchants and only the homes of Muslims were looted. An estimated 400 Muslims were displaced from their homes, many of them slept in the police station in the neighboring village of Ballabgarh. 
The following day, Muslims began to protest at the Ballabgarh police station because no one had been arrested in relation to the crimes. One month later, still no charges have been brought upon those who committed the attacks.

See also 

 Religious violence in India
 Anti-Muslim violence in India

References

External links 

 

2015 riots
Ballabhgarh
Persecution by Hindus
Anti-Muslim violence in India
Attacks on buildings and structures in 2015
Riots and civil disorder in India
Religious riots
Persecution of Muslims
May 2015 events in India
Attacks on religious buildings and structures in India
Hate crimes in India